From 2002, nine detainees who were previously Taliban prisoners were being held by the United States as enemy combatants in its Guantanamo Bay detainment camps at its Navy base in Cuba, as part of its War on Terror. The Taliban in Afghanistan had jailed each of the 9 based on opposition or suspicion of spying. The United States suspected them of being allied with the Taliban or al-Qaeda and took them into custody, treating them as enemy combatants. 

On March 9, 2004, the first of these men had been repatriated and released without being charged with any terror related crime. Private lawyers and public interest groups are working on behalf of remaining detainees to have their cases fully reviewed.

Background
The Taliban took control of Afghanistan and severely suppressed the opposition, as well as providing refuge for militant Muslims, including Osama bin Laden. The Taiban jailed many of their suspects in Kandahar prison, including five of the nine men listed below. In some accounts, they became known as the Kandahar Five.

After the 9/11 attacks in 2001, the United States, with the U.S. Army and allied forces, including the Northern Alliance, invaded Afghanistan in effort to overthrow the Taliban. The Northern Alliance liberated Kandahar prison in December 2001, freeing its 1,500 men. The press visited and met some of the men later taken into custody by the Americans and transported to Guantánamo. "Several of the men have testified that they were "sold" to the Americans by Northern Alliance troops."

The Americans captured many men in Afghanistan; they suspected them of being allied with the Taliban or al-Qaeda and transported them to a detention camp set up at Guantanamo Bay Naval Station for interrogation, in effort to penetrate terrorist networks and prevent future attacks. Among these were at least nine men who had previously been jailed by the Taliban. Clive Stafford Smith, the legal director of Reprieve, "a London-based human rights group representing 39 Guantanamo detainees", struggled to describe the situation, describing it as "Kafkaesque" or "Alice in Wonderland". Subsequently, stated, "It's frankly more than bizarre. It's horrifying."

According to the Associated Press, in June 2007 Commander Jeffrey Gordon, a Department of Defense spokesman, defended the Army's decision to continue to detain some of the men, although by then several had been released without charges:

References

Extrajudicial prisoners of the United States
Taliban